Mari Funaki (1950 – 13 May 2010) was a leading contemporary jeweller, designer, metal-smith and sculptor. She was active from 1990 to 2010. Initially a jeweller, she moved towards "purely sculptural forms" from the late 1990s.

Biography 
Funaki was born in Matsue, Shimane, Japan. She moved to Australia in 1979 and studied painting and gold and silversmithing at the Royal Melbourne Institute of Technology (RMIT).

In 1995 Funaki exhibited containers, containers for candles and gold jewellery in her exhibition Marie Funaki Metalwork in at the Crafts Council for the ACT. Work from this exhibition caught the attention of and was acquired by Jim Logan, the new assistant curator of Australian decorative arts at the National Gallery of Australia.

Funaki was known for her distinctive arthropod-like brooches, rings and bracelets, which later merged into her large scale geometric sculptural works, some up to 6 metres tall. She started Gallery Funaki, Melbourne in 1995. The gallery was regarded as one of the "key world jewellery spaces" showcasing the work of leading Australian and international jewellers.

In 2009, the Art Gallery of Western Australia held a solo exhibition Marie Funaki Works 1992–2009. Funaki produced a number of new works for this exhibition. The catalogue description of the exhibition explained:"There is always a sense of danger in her work, as the spindly legs of her insect-like containers support unlikely, unwieldy torsos, and as her rings and bracelets cultivate miniature monoliths that play with scale and weight in fascinating ways".

In 2010, the National Gallery of Australia commissioned Funaki to create a sculpture for the entrance to the new Stage 1 building which included the Australian indigenous art galleries and the southern entrance. The sculpture Twilight was created in aluminium and finished with black polymer paint. Inspired by the pukumani burial poles of the Tiwi Islands, Funaki said of this work:"I like to make my forms stir people’s emotions or imagination. As an object maker I have always been interested in the interplay and dialogue between negative and positive, between volume and space, between inside and outside."During the final stages of creating this sculpture with fabricator Robert Hook, Funaki became unwell and died in May 2010 after a long battle with cancer.

A survey exhibition of her work was held at the National Gallery of Victoria in late 2010 Marie Funaki: Objects. The exhibition followed her work from the late 1990s to 2010, mapping her development from gold and mild steel wearable objects to pure sculpture. The exhibition highlighted Funaki's "brilliant inventiveness with line, mass, volume and space across various sculptural forms." Her geometric sculptures were described as "gravity defying"

Funaki’s jewellery, objects and sculptures are held in private and public collections including the National Gallery of Australia, the Powerhouse Museum, the National Gallery of Victoria and Die Neue Sammlung in Munich.

Awards 
1996:  Herbert-Hofmann-Preis

1999:  Herbert-Hofmann-Preis

Legacy 
In 2014 the Mari Funaki Award for Contemporary Jewellery was founded.

The RMIT holds a collection of over 200 books and art catalogues

Further reading 
Mari Funaki: Objects  Jane Devery, National Gallery of Victoria, 2010

References

External links 

 Container with lid, 1995
 Brooch, 1997
 Bracelet 1, 2005
 Twilight, 2010
 Untitled, 2010
 In conversation with Mari Funaki 
 Other sculptural works by Mari Funaki
 Gallery Funaki website, Melbourne

1950 births
Date of birth missing
2010 deaths
Australian women artists
Australian jewellers
Australian sculptors
Japanese emigrants to Australia
Women jewellers